The history of New York City (1855–1897) started with the inauguration in 1855 of Fernando Wood as the first mayor from Tammany Hall, an institution that dominated the city throughout this period. Reforms led to the New York City Police Riot of June 1857. There was chaos during the American Civil War, with major rioting in the New York Draft Riots.  The Gilded Age brought about prosperity for the city's upper classes amid the further growth of a poor immigrant working class, as well as an increasing consolidation, both economic and municipal, of what would become the five boroughs in 1898.

Ocean-going steamships and steam railroads, developed in earlier decades, grew to take over most long-distance transport, bringing an ever-increasing stream of immigration and industrialization.

Pre-Civil War

Police, gangs and violence 
The new Republican Party in the late 1850s attempted to cut the power of Mayor Fernando Wood and other pro-South Democrats by abolishing the New York City Municipal Police Department in favor of a Metropolitan Police District. Resistance resulted in the New York City Police Riot of 1857. While the police were busy with their feud, the Dead Rabbits Riot between two gangs in Five Points occurred in July, lasting two days, and was stopped only by intervention of the state militia. It was the worst riot in New York City up to that time. Historian Tyler Anbinder says the "Dead Rabbit" name "so captured the imagination of New Yorkers that the press continued to use it despite the abundant evidence that no such club or gang existed." Andbinder notes that, "for more than a decade, 'Dead Rabbit' became the standard phrase by which city residents described any scandalously riotous individual or group."

Historians such as Michael Kaplan and Elliott Gorn have argued that an intensifying highly masculine working-class male identity fostered gangs, brawling, and even homicide and rape, which was fueled by New York City taverns.  The emerging male code emphasized physical courage, defiance of authority, and class pride. Irish and German immigrants brought European influences.  Sexual harassment of women increased because women were more visible outside the home, as many worked in factories and shops. Women were regarded as depersonalized objects of lewd talk, and gang rapes became an opportunity for male bonding.

Staten Island Quarantine War
From 1800 to 1858, Staten Island was the location of the largest quarantine facility in the United States.  Angry residents burned down the hospital compound in 1858 in a series of attacks known as the Staten Island Quarantine War. Although there were no deaths as a result of the attack, the arsonists completely destroyed the hospital compound.

Central Park

As the population grew explosively in Lower Manhattan after 1820, middle-class residents were drawn to the few existing open spaces, mainly cemeteries, to get away from the noises, smells, and chaotic life in the city. Landscape painter Asher B. Durand and writer William Cullen Bryant, recalling their rural upbringing and the great parks of Europe, advocated the therapeutic value of nature in the overcrowded city. Along with architect Andrew Jackson Downing, they envisioned a great park. The state government in 1853 provided $5 million and eminent domain powers to buy out the land owners of what became Central Park.  Egbert L. Viele drew the original plans, but Frederick Law Olmsted and Calvert Vaux made the final Greensward Plan design and have received the main credit.  

Several American influences came together in the design.  Landscaped rural cemeteries, such as Mount Auburn in Cambridge, Massachusetts, and Green-Wood Cemetery in Brooklyn, provided examples of idyllic, naturalistic landscapes. The most influential innovations in the Central Park design were the multiple circulation plans for pedestrians, horseback riders, and pleasure vehicles. The crossing routes for commercial traffic were concealed in sunken roadways screened with densely planted shrub belts so as to maintain a natural setting. It was the nation's first great urban park; Olmsted taught Americans a new sensibility in park environments and urban planning as an applied science with his radically naturalistic park design.

Civil War

Prior to the Civil War, in 1861, Mayor Wood proposed New York City secession from the United States as a neutral sovereign city-state to be called Tri-Insula as a way to avoid the ravages of war.  Despite strong local Copperhead sympathies, the proposal was not well received.

The city provided a major source of troops, supplies,  equipment, and financing for the Union Army. Powerful New York politicians and newspaper editors helped shape public opinion toward the war effort and the policies of President Abraham Lincoln. The port of New York, a major entry point for immigrants, served as recruiting grounds for the Army.   In July 1863, Irish Catholic protestors of conscription began five days of rioting. The  "Draft Riots", the worst in American history, targeted blacks and wealthy Republicans. It was suppressed by artillery units of the United States Army firing grapeshot that killed and wounded hundreds of rioters.  Meanwhile, the upscale membership of the New York Union League Club recruited over 2,000 black men for the 20th United States Colored Infantry to help fill the quotas and to make a major contribution to African American civil rights.  The neighboring city of Brooklyn in contrast was more pro-war.

In 1865 the Metropolitan Fire District united the fire departments of New York and Brooklyn, and was more successful than the earlier Metropolitan Police District, eventually developing into the New York City Fire Department.

Tourism and entertainment
New York increasingly became the national capital for tourism and entertainment. Grand hotels were built for the upscale visitors  New York's theater district gradually moved northward during this half century, from The Bowery up Broadway through Union Square and Madison Square, settling around Times Square at the end of the 19th century. Edwin Booth and Lillian Russell were among the Broadway stars.  Prostitutes served a wide variety of clientele, from sailors on leave to playboys.

The first nightclubs appeared in New York City in the 1840s and 1850s, including  McGlory's, and the Haymarket.  They enjoyed a national reputation for live music, dance, and vaudeville acts. They tolerated unlicensed liquor, commercial sex, and gambling cards, chiefly Faro. Practically all gambling was illegal in the city (except upscale horseracing tracks), and regular payoffs to political and police leadership was necessary. Prices were high and they were patronized by an upscale audience. Timothy Gilfoyle calls him "the first nightclubs."  By contrast, Owney Geoghegan ran the toughest nightclub in New York, 1880–83. It catered to a downscale clientele and besides the usual illegal  liquor, gambling and prostitution, it featured nighly fistfights, and occasional shootings, stabbings,  and police raids. Webster Hall is credited as the first modern nightclub. It opened in 1886 as a "social hall", originally functioning as a home for dance and political activism events.

Gilded Age

The post-war period was noted for the corruption and graft for which Tammany Hall has become proverbial, but equally for the foundation of New York's pre-eminent cultural institutions, the Metropolitan Museum of Art, the Metropolitan Opera, and the American Museum of Natural History. The Brooklyn Museum was a major institution of New York's independent sister city.

New York newspapers were read across the nation, particularly, the New York Tribune, edited by Horace Greeley, the voice of the new Republican Party.

As immigration increased in cities, poverty rose as well. The poorest crowded into low-cost housing such as the Five Points and Hell's Kitchen neighborhoods in Manhattan. These areas were quickly overridden with notorious criminal gangs such as the Five Points Gang and the Bowery Boys. Overcrowding spread germs; the death rates in big city tenements vastly exceeded those in the countryside.<ref name="TindallShi">Tindall, George Brown and Shi, David E. America: A Narrative History (Brief 9th ed. 2012) vol 2 p. 590</ref>

Rapid outward expansion required longer journeys to work and shopping for the middle class office workers and housewives.  The working class generally did not own automobiles until after 1945; they typically walked to nearby factories and patronized small neighborhood stores. The middle class demanded a better transportation system. Slow horse-drawn streetcars and faster electric trolleys were the rage in the 1880s. 

In the horse-drawn era, streets were unpaved and covered with dirt or gravel. However, this produced uneven wear, opened new hazards for pedestrians, and made for dangerous potholes for bicycles and for motor vehicles. Manhattan alone had 130,000 horses in 1900, pulling streetcars, delivery wagons, and private carriages, and leaving their waste behind. They were not fast, and pedestrians could dodge and scramble their way across the crowded streets. 

In small towns people mostly walked to their destination, so they continued to rely on dirt and gravel into the 1920s. Larger cities had much more complex transportation needs. They wanted better streets, so they paved them with wood or granite blocks.

By the end of the century, American cities boasted 30 million square yards of asphalt paving, followed by brick construction. Street-level electric trolleys moved at 12 miles per hour, and became the main transportation service for middle class shoppers and office workers. Big-city streets became paths for faster and larger and more dangerous vehicles, the pedestrians beware. In the largest cities, street railways were elevated, which increased their speed and lessened their dangers. Boston built the first subway in the 1890s followed by New York a decade later.

Immigration
The flood of immigration from Europe passed first through Castle Clinton (opened 1855) and then through Ellis Island (opened 1892) in New York Harbor, with the nearby Statue of Liberty opening in 1886. Most of the new arrivals headed to destinations across the north and west, but many made New York City their destination.

European immigration brought further social upheaval, and old world criminal societies rapidly exploited the already corrupt municipal machine politics of Tammany Hall. Housing, especially in the southern tip of Manhattan, became crowded with newly built tenements and flimsy shacks in the back. Italians settled around Mulberry Street between the East Village and Lower Manhattan, in an area later to be known as "Little Italy." Many Yiddish-speaking East European Jews came to the Lower East Side.

In the Orange Riots of July 1871 and 1872, Catholic Irish attempted to stop Protestant Irish from celebrating the anniversary of the Battle of the Boyne. These resulted in more than 33 deaths and many wounded. Pioneering photojournalist Jacob Riis documented the poor conditions of immigrant tenement dwellers in his 1890 How the Other Half Lives; he was befriended by Republican reformer Theodore Roosevelt. Roosevelt lost his mayoral race in 1886. Reformers did win in 1894, and Roosevelt undertook a major reform of the New York City Police Department in 1895–97 during his term as President of the Police Commissioners.

Public health
Epidemics (typhus, cholera, diphtheria, and tuberculosis) were rampant in the city's slums. Horse manure covered the streets. In winter, when all the grime froze, walking on the sidewalks was a challenge. Dead pigs and other carcasses remained on the street for weeks. In 1894, Colonel George E. Waring Jr. introduced sanitary reforms using a large street cleaning force.

Politics
Tammany Hall
William Tweed, better known as Boss Tweed, had become the sole leader of Tammany Hall by 1867.  From April 1870, with the passage of a city charter consolidating power in the hands of his political allies, Tweed and his cronies were able to defraud the city of some tens of millions of dollars over the next two years and eight months, most famously with the construction bill for a lavish courthouse.  The efforts of reform-oriented Democratic politicians, especially Samuel J. Tilden, as well as aggressive newspaper editors aided by the biting cartoons of Thomas Nast, helped elect opposition candidates in 1871. Tweed was convicted of forgery and larceny in 1873.  Tweed's fall put an end to the immunity of corrupt local political leaders and was a precursor to Progressive Era reforms in the city.

Tammany did not take long to rebound from Tweed's fall. Reforms demanded a general housecleaning, and former county sheriff "Honest John" Kelly was selected as the new leader.  Kelly was not implicated in the Tweed scandals and was a religious Catholic related by marriage to Archbishop John McCloskey. He cleared Tammany of Tweed's people and tightened the Grand Sachem's control over the hierarchy.  His success at revitalizing the machine was such that in the election of 1874, the Tammany candidate, William H. Wickham, unseated the unpopular reformist incumbent, William F. Havemeyer, and Democrats generally won their races, delivering control of the city back to Tammany Hall.

Theodore Roosevelt, before he became president in 1901, was deeply involved in New York City politics. He explains how the machine worked:
The organization of a party in our city is really much like that of an army. There is one great central boss, assisted by some trusted and able lieutenants; these communicate with the different district bosses, whom they alternately bully and assist. The district boss in turn has a number of half-subordinates, half-allies, under him; these latter choose the captains of the election districts, etc., and come into contact with the common healers.

 Reformers 
Middle-class moral sensibilities were deeply opposed to prostitution and all forms of gambling.  The reform movement was strongest in the 1890s. Reform was led by men such as the Reverend Charles H. Parkhurst, the leading Presbyterian pastor and president of the New York Society for the Prevention of Crime; reform mayor William L. Strong, and his police commissioner Theodore Roosevelt. Reformers passed laws in the state legislature against any emerging gambling venue.  Such laws were enforced in most small towns and rural areas, but not in New York's larger cities, where political machines controlled the police and the courts.

Economy

In 1874, nearly 61% of all U.S. exports passed through New York harbor. In 1884, nearly 70% of U.S. imports came through New York. The eventual rise of ports on the Gulf of Mexico and on the Pacific coast reduced New York's share of imports and exports to about 47% in 1910.  The city's banking resources grew 250% between 1888 and 1908, compared to the national increase of 26%.  Between 1860 and 1907, the assessed value of the land and buildings on Manhattan rose from $1.7 billion to $6.7 billion.

The city and its suburbs, mainly Brooklyn and Long Island City, also became important in light industry. Its factories dominated the garment industry and some high technology industries of the second industrial revolution such as sewing machines and pianos. It was an important center for other hi-tech items such as hard rubber products and electrical goods. Petroleum and chemical works sprang up along Newtown Creek, Bayonne, New Jersey, and other industrial suburbs.

Department stores
In modern major cities, the department store made a dramatic appearance in the middle of the 19th century and permanently reshaped shopping habits and the definition of service and luxury.  Similar developments were underway in Paris and London.
New York became a regional and national destination for upscale shoppers, thanks to its development of the modern department store. London and Paris were developing department stores around the same time, and the leaders quickly adopted innovations. In 1846, Alexander Turney Stewart established his "Marble Palace" on Broadway, between Chambers and Reade Streets. He offered upscale retail merchandise at fixed prices. Though it was clad in white marble to look like a Renaissance palazzo, the building's cast iron construction had large plate glass windows that permitted major seasonal displays, especially in the Christmas shopping season. Increasingly, the clientele were women from wealthy or upper-middle-class families.

In 1862, Stewart built a new store on a full city block with eight floors and nineteen departments of dress goods and furnishing materials, carpets, glass and china, toys and sports equipment, ranged around a central glass-covered court. His innovations included buying from manufacturers for cash and in large quantities, keeping his markup small and prices low, truthful presentation of merchandise, the one-price policy (so there was no haggling), simple merchandise returns and cash refund policy, selling for cash and not credit, buyers who searched worldwide for quality merchandise, departmentalization, vertical and horizontal integration, volume sales, and free services for customers such as waiting rooms and free delivery of purchases. His innovations were quickly copied by other department stores.

In 1858, Rowland Hussey Macy founded Macy's as a dry goods store. Benjamin Altman and Lord & Taylor soon competed with Stewart as New York's earliest department stores.

By the 1880s New York's retail center had moved uptown, forming a stretch of retail shopping from "Marble Palace" that was called the "Ladies' Mile".  By 1894 the major stores competed in the Christmas season with elaborate Christmas window displays; in 1895 Macy's featured 13 tableaux, including scenes from Jack and the Beanstalk, Gulliver's Travels and other children's favorites.

The department store was especially important for women; in middle-class families women took control of the purchasing, and the department stores catered to their tastes.  Furthermore, ambitious young women from the middle class who wanted a career were welcomed into the clerical ranks, where they developed social skills to work with their upscale customers.Susan Benson, Counter cultures: Saleswomen, managers, and customers in American department stores, 1890-1940 (1987).

 Skyscrapers and apartment buildings 

New inventions facilitated the emergence of the skyscraper in the 1880s—it was a characteristic American style that was not widely copied around the world until the late 20th century. Construction required several major innovations, including the elevator and structural steel.  The steel skeleton, developed in the 1880s, replaced the heavy brick walls that were limited to 15 or so stories in height. The skyscraper also required a complex internal structure to solve issues of ventilation, steam heat, gas lighting (and later electricity), and plumbing. 

The city's housing involved a wide variety of styles, but most of the attention focused on the tenement house for the working class and the apartment building for the middle class. The apartment building came first, as middle-class professionals, businessmen, and white-collar workers realized they did not need and could scarcely afford single-family dwellings in the high-cost real estate districts of the city. Boarding houses were inappropriate for family; hotel suites were too expensive.  In outlying neighborhoods there were many apartments over stores and shops, usually occupied by proprietors of small local businesses. Apartment dwellers paid rent and did not own their apartments until the emergence of cooperatives in the 20th century. Turnover was very high, and there was seldom was a sense of neighborhood community.Elizabeth Collins Cromley, Alone Together: A History of New York's Early Apartments (1990)
  
Starting with the luxurious Stuyvesant Apartments that opened in 1869, and the even more lavish The Dakota in 1884, affluent tenants hired full-time staff to handle the upkeep and maintenance, as well as security.Andrew Alpern, New York's Fabulous Luxury Apartments: With Original Floor Plans from the Dakota, River House, Olympic Tower and Other Great Buildings (1987) covers 75 famous buildings starting in 1869.

The less-lavish middle-class apartment buildings provided gas lighting, elevators, good plumbing, central heating, and maintenance men on call. Apartment buildings were built along the paths of the street railways since the middle-class tenants rode the streetcar to work, while the working class saved a nickel each way and walked.

The working class crowded into tenement houses, with far fewer features and amenities. Novelist Stephen Crane in Maggie: A Girl of the Streets (1893) wrote of an Irish tenement neighborhood characterized by poverty and violence:"Eventually they entered into a dark region where, from a careening building, a dozen gruesome doorways gave up loads of babies to the street and the gutter. A wind of early autumn raised yellow dust from cobble and swirled it against an hundred windows. Long streamers of garments fluttered from fire escapes. In all unhandy places there were buckets, brooms, rags, and bottles. In the street infants played or fought with other infants or sat stupidly in the way of vehicles. Formidable women, with uncombed hair and disordered dress, gossiped while leaning on railings, or screamed in frantic quarrels. Withered persons, in curious postures of submission to something, sat smoking pipes in obscure corners. A thousand odors of cooking food came forth to the street. The building quivered and creaked from the weight of humanity stamping about in its bowels."Tenements were cheap and easy to build, and filled up almost the entire lot. There were typically five story walk-ups, with four separate apartments on each floor. There was minimal air circulation and sunlight. Until the Tenement House Act of 1879, newly built tenements lacked running water or indoor toilets. A law in 1901 required indoor plumbing be retrofitted to older tenements. Garbage pickup was erratic until late in the 19th century. Rent was cheap for those who could endure the dust, clutter, smells and noises; the only cheaper alternatives were squalid basement rooms in older buildings.  Most of the tenements survived until the urban renewal movement of the 1950s.Raymond A. Mohl, The New City: Urban America in the Industrial Age, 1860-1920 (1985) pp 47-52

Neighborhoods
Pre-war steam ferries had already made Brooklyn Heights into a bedroom community for affluent professionals on Wall Street and other urban areas. Elevated railroads, operated by the Manhattan Railway Company, and other new public transport expanded the commuter area of New York, allowing development of suburbs for commuters of more modest means in Upper West Side and other distant areas. Plans were made for subways to still more remote exurbs such as Harlem and the West Bronx.

In the late 19th century, the island's schist bedrock encouraged the early skyscrapers whose successors characterize its skyline today. The Great Blizzard of 1888 exposed the vulnerability of the urban infrastructure connecting those buildings, encouraging the undergrounding of electric and telephone lines, and plans were made for a subway line.

Consolidation

In 1855, the City of Brooklyn annexed Williamsburg and Bushwick, forming the third most-populous city in America.  In 1870, Long Island City was formed in Queens.  In 1874, New York City annexed the West Bronx, west of the Bronx River. The Brooklyn Bridge, completed in 1883, epitomized the heroic confidence of a generation and drew the two cities of Brooklyn and New York inexorably together. As Brooklyn annexed the remainder of Kings County in the decade from 1886 to 1896, the issue of consolidation grew more pressing.

The modern city of Greater New York — the five boroughs — was created in 1898, with the consolidation of the cities of New York (then Manhattan and the Bronx) and Brooklyn with the largely rural areas of Queens and Staten Island.

See also

 Timeline of New York City, 1850s-1890s
 New York City Police Riot of 1857
 1886 New York City mayoral election

References

Further reading

 Anbinder, Tyler. "From Famine to Five Points: Lord Lansdowne's Irish Tenants Encounter North America's Most Notorious Slum." American Historical Review 107.2 (2002): 351–387. in JSTOR
 Anbinder, Tyler. Five Points: the 19th-century New York City neighborhood that invented tap dance, stole elections, and became the world's most notorious slum (Simon and Schuster, 2001).
 Beckert, Sven. The Monied Metropolis: New York City and the Consolidation of the American Bourgeoisie, 1850–1896 (2001)

 Broxmeyer, Jeffrey D. Electoral Capitalism: The Party System in New York's Gilded Age . (U of Pennsylvania Press, 2020) covers city and state.

 Burns, Ric, and James Sanders. New York: An Illustrated History (2003), large-scale book version of Burns PBS documentary, New York: A Documentary Film an eight part, 17½ hour documentary film directed by Ric Burns for PBS. It originally aired in 1999 with additional episodes airing in 2001 and 2003.
 Burrows, Edwin G., and Mike Wallace. Gotham: a history of New York City to 1898 (Oxford University Press, 1998), The standard scholarly survey; 1390 pages onlibe review
 Bernstein, Iver. The New York City Draft Riots: Their Significance for American Society and Politics in the Age of the Civil War (1990)
 Callow, Alexander B. The Tweed Ring (1966).
 Chernow, Ron. The house of Morgan: an American banking dynasty and the rise of modern finance (2001)
 Chernow, Ron. Titan: The Life of John D. Rockefeller, Sr.(2007)
 Ernst, Robert. Immigrant Life in New York City, 1825-1863 (Syracuse University Press, 1994)
 Fitzgerald, Maureen. Habits of Compassion: Irish Catholic Nuns and the Origins of New York's Welfare System, 1830-1920 (University of Illinois Press, 2006)

 Hershkowitz, Leo. Tweed's New York: Another Look. (New York: Anchor Press, 1977); scholarly study that argues Tweed was mostly innocent. online review

 Homberger, Eric. Mrs. Astor's New York: Money and Social Power in a Gilded Age (Yale University Press, 2004)
 Homberger, Eric. The historical atlas of New York City: A visual celebration of 400 years of New York City's history (Macmillan, 2005)
 Jackson, Kenneth D. Encyclopedia of New York City (2nd ed. 2010); a massive compendium of authoritative short articles 
 Laster, Margaret R., and Chelsea Bruner, eds. New York: Art and Cultural Capital of the Gilded Age (2018)
 Livingston, E. H. President Lincoln's Third Largest City: Brooklyn and The Civil War (1994)
 McKay, Ernest A. The Civil War and New York City (Syracuse University Press, 1990)
 Quigley, David.  Second Founding: New York City, Reconstruction, and the Making of American Democracy (Hill and Wang, 2004) excerpt

 Scherzer. Kenneth A. The unbounded community: Neighborhood life and social structure in New York City, 1830-1875 (Duke University Press, 1992)
 Spann, Edward K. Gotham at War: New York City, 1860-1865 (2002)
 
 

Primary sources
 Gellman, David N.  and David Quigley, eds. Jim Crow New York: A Documentary History of Race and Citizenship, 1777-1877 (2003)

 Jackson, Kenneth T. and David S. Dunbar, eds. Empire City: New York Through the Centuries (2005), 1015 pages of excerpts excerpt
 Still, Bayrd, ed. Mirror for Gotham: New York as Seen by Contemporaries from Dutch Days to the Present (New York University Press, 1956) online edition
 Stokes, I.N. Phelps. The Iconography of Manhattan Island, 1498-1909 compiled from original sources and illustrated by photo-intaglio reproductions of important maps plans views and documents in public and private collections  (6 vols., 1915–28). A highly detailed, heavily illustrated chronology of Manhattan and New York City. see The Iconography of Manhattan Island All volumes are on line free at:
 I.N. Phelps Stokes; The Iconography of Manhattan Island Vol 1. 1915 v. 1. The period of discovery (1524-1609); the Dutch period (1609-1664). The English period (1664-1763). The Revolutionary period (1763-1783). Period of adjustment and reconstruction; New York as the state and federal capital (1783-1811)	
 I.N. Phelps Stokes; The Iconography of Manhattan Island Vol 2. 1916 v. 2. Cartography: an essay on the development of knowledge regarding the geography of the east coast of North America; Manhattan Island and its environs on early maps and charts / by F.C. Wieder and I.N. Phelps Stokes. The Manatus maps. The Castello plan. The Dutch grants. Early New York newspapers (1725-1811). Plan of Manhattan Island in 1908
 I.N. Phelps Stokes; The Iconography of Manhattan Island Vol 3. 1918 v. 3. The War of 1812 (1812-1815). Period of invention, prosperity, and progress (1815-1841). Period of industrial and educational development (1842-1860). The Civil War (1861-1865); period of political and social development (1865-1876). The modern city and island (1876-1909)
 I.N. Phelps Stokes; The Iconography of Manhattan Island Vol 4. 1922; v. 4. The period of discovery (565-1626); the Dutch period (1626-1664). The English period (1664-1763). The Revolutionary period, part I (1763-1776)
 I.N. Phelps Stokes; The Iconography of Manhattan Island Vol 5. 1926; v. 5. The Revolutionary period, part II (1776-1783). Period of adjustment and reconstruction New York as the state and federal capital (1783-1811). The War of 1812 (1812-1815) ; period of invention, prosperity, and progress (1815-1841). Period of industrial and educational development (1842-1860). The Civil War (1861-1865) ; Period of political and social development (1865-1876). The modern city and island (1876-1909)
 I.N. Phelps Stokes; The Iconography of Manhattan Island Vol 6. 1928; v. 6. Chronology: addenda. Original grants and farms. Bibliography. Index.

Older books

 
 
 
 
 
 
 
 

 JAMES D. MCCABE, JR.: LIGHTS AND SHADOWS OF NEW YORK LIFE; OR, THE SIGHTS AND SENSATIONS OF A GREAT CITY. illustrated with numerous fine engravings of noted places, life and scenes in New York. NATIONAL PUBLISHING COMPANY, PHILADELPHIA, Pa.; CINCINNATI, Ohio; CHICAGO, Ill.; ST. LOUIS, Mo. 1872 -  A Project Gutenberg e-book''

Chronology